Aada Brathuku  is a 1965 Indian Telugu-language drama film, produced by S. S. Vasan of Gemini Studios and directed by Vedantam Raghavayya. It stars N. T. Rama Rao, Kantha Rao and Devika (her first appearance in a Telugu Gemini production), with the music composed by the duo Viswanathan–Ramamoorthy (M. S. Viswanathan and T. K. Ramamoorthy). The duo parted ways later, making this their last joint appearance in a Telugu film. The film is a remake of the studio's own Hindi film Zindagi (1964).

Plot 
Seetha, an unemployed woman, takes up stage acting as a career. A wealthy man Gangaraju is after her and uses his henchman Joogulu to kidnap her. During the attempt, Raja rescues her and the two fall in love. He is the son of a Zamindar Rao Bahadoor Ranganatham, who has a poor opinion of Seetha. However, after many hurdles, the two marry. The director of Seetha's stage troupe, Gopal Rao too is in love with her, but she never responds. Accidentally, Gangaraju is murdered, the blame comes on Gopal and he is arrested. He has an alibi — on the night of the murder, a young woman stayed with him in his house, but then he does not disclose her identity. The woman turns out to be Seetha, and she gives them the evidence. One of the members of the jury is her father-in-law, and complications follow, with the husband leaving her and wishing to marry again. However, the truth comes out and the family is united in the end.

Cast 
N. T. Rama Rao as Raja
Devika as Seeta
S. V. Ranga Rao as Rao Bahadoor Ranganatham
Kantha Rao as Gopal Rao
Rajanala as Gangaraju
Padmanabham as Pasupathi
Satyanarayana as Jogulu
Allu Ramalingaiah as Panthulu
Mukkamala as Sher Khan
Mahankali Venkaiah as Veerabhadram
K. V. S. Sarma as Lawyer
Mikkilineni as Judge
Geetanjali as Parvathi
Rushyendramani as Aaya
Pushpavalli as Ayesha
M. V. Rajamma as Shanta

Soundtrack 
Music composed by the duo Viswanathan–Ramamoorthy.

References

External links 

 

1965 drama films
1965 films
Films scored by Viswanathan–Ramamoorthy
Gemini Studios films
Indian black-and-white films
Indian drama films
Telugu remakes of Hindi films